Mannam Memorial Residential Higher Secondary School (MMRHSS), is a co-educational boarding school in Neeramankara, Thiruvananthapuram, Kerala state, India.

MMRHS is a day cum boarding school for the students in the age group 4 to 17. It has classes from Kindergarten to Class XII.

It uses English as the medium of instruction.

Location
The school is located on a flood plain, on the banks of the Karamana River.

Management
MMRHSS is managed by Nair Service Society (NSS).

References

Boarding schools in Kerala
Private schools in Thiruvananthapuram
High schools and secondary schools in Thiruvananthapuram